Wheaton Missouri and North Arkansas Railroad Depot is a historic train station located at Wheaton, Barry County, Missouri. It was built in 1908 by the Missouri and Northern Arkansas Railroad.  It is a one-story rectangular frame building with a hipped roof.  It measures 18 feet by 58 feet and features a three-sided bay window.  It remained in use until 1947.

It was added to the National Register of Historic Places in 2000.

References

Railway stations on the National Register of Historic Places in Missouri
Railway stations in the United States opened in 1908
Railway stations closed in 1947
National Register of Historic Places in Barry County, Missouri
1908 establishments in Missouri
Former Missouri Pacific Railroad stations
Former railway stations in Missouri